The Tennessee Volunteers men's track and field program represents the University of Tennessee in the sport of track and field.  The indoor and outdoor programs compete in Division I of the National Collegiate Athletic Association (NCAA) and the Southeastern Conference (SEC).  The Vols host their home outdoor meets at the newly renovated Tom Black Track at LaPorte Stadium, located on the university's Knoxville, Tennessee campus. Their rich tradition of success features 4 national titles, 7 finishes as national runner-ups, 62 NCAA individual champions, numerous All-Americans, 25 Olympians, 43 SEC championships (a conference-leading 25 outdoor wins), and 108 combined scoring appearances in the NCAA indoor and outdoor championships.

History 
The Tennessee Volunteers men's track and field program began in 1901 and first started intercollegiate competition in 1909 when the SIAA was formed. Records before the 1921 season were not kept, and are therefore incomplete. The Vols did not compete in the 1918 and 1919 seasons due to World War I. The team later joined the Southeastern Conference in 1933 where they have competed for the past 75 years. The sport was also kept on hold from 1943–1946 because of World War II and would later resume outdoor meets in 1947 and indoor meets in 1960.

Since the formation of the SEC the Tennessee Volunteers have been a consistent force in competition winning a combined 43 SEC titles, 3 NCAA Outdoor Track & Field Championships and 1 NCAA Indoor Track & Field Championship.

Several coaches are responsible for the historical success of the UT track & field program. Chuck Rohe finished with a record of 87–10 (.896) and won an astonishing 15 consecutive SEC titles. Stan Huntsman took over the program in 1971 and would continue the success started by Rohe. During his tenure he led the Vols to a record of 93-26-3 (.775), 20 SEC titles and won the program's first NCAA title. In 1986 Doug Brown became the 4th coach for the Vols track & field team and finished with a 53–8 (.869) record and won 4 SEC titles and 1 NCAA title. Bill Webb took the program over following the 1995 season and would finish with a 52–1 (.981) record and an unprecedented 4 SEC titles and 2 NCAA titles, becoming the first coach to win multiple national titles at Tennessee.

Christian Coleman became the first Vol to win The Bowerman, an award that honors collegiate track & field's most outstanding athlete of the year. In 2017, Coleman swept NCAA titles in the 60 meters indoors and 100 meters outdoors, setting collegiate records in both.

Coaching staff 
It was released on May 21, 2014, that Coach JJ Clark would not be retained as Director of Track and Field/Cross Country. Penn State's Beth Alford-Sullivan was hired as UT head coach in June 2014.
As of 2022, the coaching positions are as follows:
Director of Track & Field/Cross Country: Beth Alford-Sullivan, 
Jumps: Nick Newman,
Sprints/Hurdles/Relays: Ken Harden,
Sprints/Hurdles/Relays: David Neville,
Throws: John Newell, 
Distance/Recruiting Coordinator: Austin Whitelaw, and
Volunteer Pole Vault: Jim "Jimbo" Sullivan.

Head coaches
Source

Yearly Record
Source

Note: The 2020 season was canceled after the SEC Indoor Championships due to the Coronavirus Pandemic, the SEC Outdoor and both NCAA Championships were not held.

^Chuck Rohe coached the 1971 team through the indoor season, while Stan Huntsman took over the program for the outdoor championships.

NCAA Individual Event Champions

The Vols have claimed 26 NCAA Indoor individual championships and 36 NCAA Outdoor individual champions all-time.

Conference Individual Event Champions

Tennessee Vol athletes have won a total of 174 SEC Indoor individual titles, and 226 SEC Outdoor individual crowns through the end of the 2022 season.

Tennessee Volunteer Olympians 
Through the 2020 Summer Olympics, 25 Tennessee athletes have represented 6 different nations at the Olympic Games, winning a total of 4 gold, 4 silver, and 2 bronze medals.

Medalists

Participants

^Did not compete due to boycott.

See also 
Tennessee women's track and field
Tennessee men's cross country
Tennessee women's cross country

References

External links 
 University of Tennessee Athletics - Official Athletics Website – Tennessee Volunteers sports news from The Knoxville News Sentinel.
  – Official webpage of the Tennessee Volunteers track and field teams.